Camborne, New Zealand is a hilltop and seaside suburb of Porirua.

Camborne covers an area of 0.84 km², including a land area of 0.84 km². Most of the suburb is a short walk from Porirua Harbour, and many homes have views of the harbour, neighbouring hills, the sea and Mana Island.

History

Camborne was developed over a 35-year period from the 1960s, initially by an investment company headed by a Mr Arthur Cornish. It was named after Camborne, Cornwall. Most of its street names are of Cornish origin, but its main street, Pope Street, is named after William George Pope (known as Bob), who was an honoured former resident of the adjoining suburb of Plimmerton.

The Paremata Residents Association includes members from Camborne.

Demography

Camborne had a population of 2,013 at the 2018 New Zealand census, an increase of 105 people (5.5%) since the 2013 census, and an increase of 348 people (20.9%) since the 2006 census. There were 726 households. There were 966 males and 1,044 females, giving a sex ratio of 0.93 males per female. The median age was 40.5 years (compared with 37.4 years nationally), with 435 people (21.6%) aged under 15 years, 303 (15.1%) aged 15 to 29, 1,026 (51.0%) aged 30 to 64, and 249 (12.4%) aged 65 or older.

Ethnicities were 89.4% European/Pākehā, 9.5% Māori, 2.8% Pacific peoples, 6.7% Asian, and 3.6% other ethnicities (totals add to more than 100% since people could identify with multiple ethnicities).

The proportion of people born overseas was 21.0%, compared with 27.1% nationally.

Although some people objected to giving their religion, 55.1% had no religion, 34.4% were Christian, 0.9% were Hindu, 0.4% were Muslim, 1.0% were Buddhist and 1.9% had other religions.

Of those at least 15 years old, 546 (34.6%) people had a bachelor or higher degree, and 144 (9.1%) people had no formal qualifications. The median income was $51,400, compared with $31,800 nationally. The employment status of those at least 15 was that 933 (59.1%) people were employed full-time, 237 (15.0%) were part-time, and 45 (2.9%) were unemployed.

Economy

In 2018, 11.5% of the workforce worked in construction, 9.0% worked in education, 8.7% worked in healthcare, 3.8% worked in manufacturing, 3.8% worked in hospitality, and 2.8% worked in transport.

Camborne does not have its own shops, but is within walking distance of the Plimmerton and Mana shopping centres, and within driving distance of the Porirua and Wellington city centres.

Transportation

As of 2018, among those who commute to work, 71.0% drove a car, 11.3% rode in a car, 2.7% used a bike, and 2.7% walked or ran. No one used public transport. 

Apart from school buses for local schools such as Plimmerton School and Aotea College, there is no public transport available in Camborne.  The closest public transport stations are Mana and Plimmerton train stations.

References

External links
 More description of Camborne and Plimmerton
 Mana-Camborne Community Profile from Statistics NZ
https://web.archive.org/web/20190118013507/http://porirualibrary.org.nz/Heritage/History-of-Plimmerton-and-Camborne

Suburbs of Porirua